Butt-Head is a fictional character and one of the two protagonists from the MTV/Paramount+ animated series Beavis and Butt-Head. He is voiced by the show's creator, Mike Judge. 

Judge got the name Butt-Head from his university days, when he knew a couple of other students who had the nicknames 'Iron Butt' and 'Butt-Head'.

Characteristics
Of the title characters, Butt-Head appears to be the leader of the two. He is calmer, older, cockier and slightly more intelligent and self-aware than Beavis, but is oblivious to subtleties, is semi-literate and still significantly more dimwitted than the other characters in the show. Regardless, as the 'leader', he is usually confident in everything he says and does – no matter how ridiculous or frivolous it is. Dan Tobin of The Boston Phoenix described Butt-head as "ringleader, the devious visionary."

Butt-Head seems to be the lazier and crueler of the two. He never seems to react to things unless they catch his attention, in which case he describes them as 'cool'. Beavis, on the other hand, always has some kind of reaction, although his actions predictably end with bad results.

Butt-Head has a severe overbite, wears dental braces, and has brown hair and squinted eyes. His top gums are often exposed and he speaks with a nasally deep voice and a slight lisp, repeatedly punctuating his speech with his trademark chuckle ("Uh huh huh huh") and mostly stammers before speaking ("Uhhh" or "Ehhhh"). He is usually shown wearing an AC/DC T-shirt. In merchandising appearances, his shirt displays the word 'Skull', to avoid licensing issues. In the 2022 revival, Butt-Head's older self is overweight, balding, and wears a brown shirt jacket and white T-shirt.

Because of inconsistent animation in the television series, Butt-head's height varies, but in the feature film "Beavis and Butt-Head Do America", which featured largely refined animation from the series, Butt-Head is consistently much taller than Beavis throughout the entire film.

Though Butt-Head is physically weak to the point of being unable to lift a bar without weights (Buff n' Stuff) even with help from Beavis, he still seems to win most fights with Beavis. However, the pair were not weak in the first two seasons, in which they are able to overpower on different occasions Stewart, a security guard and some Mexican children playing piñata.

Butt-Head's parents are not seen, except for in Beavis and Butt-head Do America. His father is shown as a former Mötley Crüe roadie voiced by David Letterman (credited as Earl Hofert) and his mother in "This Book Sucks".

Relationship with Beavis

The series appears to show both title characters living in the same house. The movie Beavis and Butt-Head Do America gives a quick glimpse of their fathers telling the boys how their mothers got pregnant (both groups failed to make the connection of their kinship). Judge calls the two men 'their dads' on the DVD commentary.

On many occasions, Butt-Head is depicted as being abusive towards Beavis, usually slapping, punching or insulting Beavis. In several episodes Butt-head shows no concern for Beavis, whether Beavis is being severely beaten (Teen Talk, Tired and Do America), abandoned (B&B vs the Vending Machine) or deported to Mexico (Vaya Con Cornholio). The feeling appears to be mutual, as seen in Water Safety when Butt-head nearly drowns in a pool and Beavis remains indifferent to Butt-head's near-death experience, and in Choke when Butt-head chokes on a chicken nugget and Beavis takes his time attempting to help him as if it were nothing serious. Beavis tells the 9-1-1 operator "He's not really my friend". When Butt-head is in a situation when he may need Beavis' help, Beavis' reluctance to help him may be due to a failure to realize that Butt-Head needs help. In Choke, when Butt-head tries to demonstrate that he is choking Beavis says "I hate this stupid game", as if Butt-head were playing a game of charades. When Beavis gets a nosebleed (caused by Butt-head punching him in the face), Butt-head "tries" to help him, resulting in Beavis losing a great deal of blood (Nosebleed). In The Final Judgement of Beavis, after Beavis knocks himself out by crashing into a wall of the house (imitating a maneuver by Robocop on television), Butt-head revives him by dumping a bucket of cold water on him.

The two characters spend almost all of their time with each other, if not all of it. They share the same occupation, and usually compliment each other when one makes any sort of endeavor, especially if it involves their lifelong goal to 'score with chicks'. It can be inferred that, despite their abusive relationship, the duo are still best friends, considering their shared activities, residency, interests, and simply for their lack of any other friends.

Relationship with other characters

Butt-Head is especially scornful of Stewart Stevenson, a nerdy, overweight teen, who wants to be friends with the duo. He greatly admires Todd, an older bully who takes advantage of the duo and pushes them around. He and Beavis aspire to be in Todd's "gang", sometimes subjecting themselves to considerable abuse in vain attempts to be accepted. Although he pretends to dislike Daria at times (derisively calling her "Diarrhea"), Butt-head appears to respect her intelligence. He is generally a thorn in the side of both the Maxi Mart owner and his neighbor Tom Anderson. The duo spend a lot of time loitering in and around Maxi Mart, annoying both the owner and the customers (especially women, with their weak pick-up lines). Mr. Anderson continually hires the two to do chores and asks favors of them, despite disastrous results each time. He does not seem to recall who they are from one encounter to the next, apparently due to poor sight and/or senility. He has been seen talking to other students in the classroom such as an overweight teen who was telling them about Jurassic Park and he seemed to be getting along with him and listening.

Mr. Van Driessen is alone among teachers at Highland High in that he sees potential in the duo and he tries to reach out to them and encourage them. He makes several attempts to teach them life lessons, to no avail. Conversely, Coach Buzzcut takes every opportunity to embarrass them, exposing both their stupidity and their lack of manliness. Though he shares a mutual hatred for Buzzcut like Beavis, Butt-head also has shown a little respect for him unlike Van Driessen. Principal McVicker has no idea what to do with them, as virtually every attempt he makes to instill discipline in them fails miserably. He has however been able to exploit Beavis and Butt-head's fear of expulsion and being forced to attend Hope High School (a delinquent school) once in No Laughing. Ms. Dickey is among the rest of the teachers who despises the duo, especially when Butt-head laughs when she mentioned sperms in class. Mr. Herrera has shown mutual dislike for the boys, especially when they mispronounce his name and their inability to speak proper Spanish in his class.

Cultural impact
U.S. Senator Fritz Hollings misidentified Butt-head with the name "Buffcoat" during the 1993 Senate hearings into violence on television, saying "We've got this – what is it – Buffcoat and Beaver or Beaver and something else... I haven't seen it, I don't watch it, but whatever it is, it was at 7 o'clock – Buffcoat – and they put it on now at 10:30, I think."

See also

References

Beavis and Butt-Head characters
Fictional characters from Texas
Television characters introduced in 1992
Animated characters introduced in 1992
Comedy film characters
Animated human characters
Male characters in animated series
Teenage characters in film
Teenage characters in television
Fictional cannabis users
Fictional waiting staff